Palimpsest is a 2009 science fiction novella by Charles Stross, exploring the conjunction of time travel and deep time. Originally published in Stross's 2009 collection Wireless, it won the 2010 Hugo Award for Best Novella.

Subterranean Press has announced that they will be reprinting the novella separately in 2011.

Inspiration
Stross has stated that Palimpsest is effectively a rewrite of The End of Eternity, by Isaac Asimov.

Plot
Pierce is a police officer with the Stasis, a special institution dedicated to the preservation of humanity by its agents who are able to travel through time. After every extinction event resulting in humanity's end, the Stasis reseeds Earth with a replacement group of humans time-jumped from an earlier era. However, the Opposition, an organisation that seems to struggle against the Stasis, has been created over time, and it seems that Pierce is somehow tied to it.

References

Hugo Award for Best Novella winning works
2009 British novels
2011 British novels
Novels by Charles Stross
Novels about time travel
British novellas
Subterranean Press books